Mithila was the capital city of the Kingdom of the Videhas located in Janakpur in present-day Nepal which was ruled by King Janaka.,

Dispute
Janakpur, in present-day Nepal, has been claimed to be the location of the ancient city of Mithila.  However, archaeological evidence has not been found to support these claims.  Some scholars have claimed Baliraajgadh in present-day Madhubani district of Bihar, India to be the location of Mithila.  Some archaeological evidences have been found in Baliraajgadh, however, excavation has not been done yet.  Some people also claim Sitamarhi in present-day Bihar, India to be the location of Mithila.

Notes

References

History of India